HMS Vigo was a 74-gun third rate ship of the line of the Royal Navy, launched on 21 February 1810 at Rochester.

She became a receiving ship in 1827, and was broken up in 1865.

Notes

References

Lavery, Brian (2003) The Ship of the Line - Volume 1: The development of the battlefleet 1650-1850. Conway Maritime Press. .

Ships of the line of the Royal Navy
Vengeur-class ships of the line
1810 ships
Ships built on the River Medway